Sleiman Damien is a Lebanese musician, music producer, and DJ specializing in modern Arab pop fusion. Many of his musical production collaborations topped Lebanese and regional Arab charts.

Early life and education
Damien attended the Collège des Sœurs des Saints Cœurs in Kfarhbab-Ghazir. During his early career, he set up a small recording studio at home, and experimented with various musical genres.

Work 
Damien rose to prominence in 2014 through his collaboration with Lebanese singer Carole Samaha. The hit song “Sahranin” showcased Sleiman's music arrangement style that combines Arabic pop music with upbeat EDM.

In 2015, Damien associated with Lebanese Techno artist and producer Tarek Majdalani; they started the deep house duo "Three Machines". Damien and Majdalani formed a long term working relationship, collaborating on several high-profile projects for veteran mainstream Arab music stars. In 2016 Lebanese singer Assi El Hellani met Damien and Majdalani, he  was impressed with their work, and they landed their first music production collaboration. Their first collaboration, "Aheb El Leil", topped the Lebanese music charts. Damien and Majdalani also arranged songs for both Al-Waleed and Maritta Hellani. During a 2017 television interview, Majdalani who comes from a Techno music background, attributed his introduction to Arabic Pop music production to Damien.

In April 2016, Damien was a founding member, together with renowned Lebanese pianist Michel Fadel, of Quartet Music, an event management and entertainment collaborative that highlights young musical talent. Fadel and Damien collaborated again, together with long-term partner Tarek Majdalani, on light and music spectacle for the Jounieh International Festival  complete with a philharmonic orchestra.

Damien works both with startup artists and well-established Arab stars, including George Wassouf, Walid Toufic, Haifa Wehbe, and Ragheb Alama. He recognized the musical talent of Lebanese young artist Zef, whom he spotted when the latter busked in the streets of Byblos in the early 2010s. In 2019, 7 years after their initial meeting, Damien produced all of Zef's mellow alternative pop tracks. Damien also regularly produces full albums and tracks for indie bands and international artists such as Anthony Touma, and Adonis who describe him as a fifth band member.

Damien, and songwriter and composer Nabil Khoury approached Abeer Nehme with a song through Universal Music MENA. The resulting collaboration, "Bala Ma Nhess", was an instant success, garnering millions of YouTube views shortly after its release in March 2022. "Bala Ma Nhess" which was Damien and Nehme's first collaboration, topped the Lebanese music charts. Nehme announced future collaboration with Damien, and in an An-Nahar interview, credited his mixing and production skills as key factors in the song's success. Damien and Nassif Zeytoun’2 2022 "Bel Ahlam" was another instant hit, topping the regional charts days after its release.

Style
Damien's Arab fusion music features elements from various music styles, including rock and EDM. Unlike traditional Arab music production which prioritizes lyrics, Damien focused on integrating arrangement and music production at the starting phase of each project. He believes that more independent artists will have a wider reach with the current trend of music consumption democratization. He also believes that eclecticism in his musical collaborations will make various styles palatable to a more diverse range of audiences, bridging the gap between established artists and the Arab indie scene. In a 2023 interview, he cited Zef & Stephanie Atala’s "El Bekle" as an example of new independent talent that broke into the Middle Eastern music charts and competed with conventional records from industry heavyweights. He also stated that his goal is to help niche songs crossover to the mainstream, and Arabic music to reach the global audience by collaborating with more regional and international artists.

Personal life
Damien is open about his struggles with anxiety, which he believes is a common issue among industry professionals and musicians in the Arab region.

Selected works

Citations

References

External links 

 Three machines 

Living people
Lebanese record producers
Year of birth missing (living people)